Vileh or Veyleh or Vaileh or Vayleh may refer to:
 Vileh, Ilam
 Veyleh, Dalahu, Kermanshah Province
 Veyleh, Gahvareh, Dalahu County, Kermanshah Province
 Vileh, Kurdistan